Antonio Martínez Luna was the Attorney General of the Mexican state of Baja California in the administration of governor Eugenio Elorduy Walther of the National Action Party.

See also
 Antonio Carmona Añorve — Attorney General for Mexicali during the government of Governor Elorduy convicted for similar crimes

References

Year of birth missing (living people)
Living people
Politicians from Baja California
National Action Party (Mexico) politicians
Mexican prosecutors